Beverley "Bev" French (born 1970) is a British model and television presenter. She was the former presenter of The Mint on ITV Play. She has also presented The Great Big British Quiz and Rovers Return Quiz.

She has alluded to being a Manchester City Football Club supporter. In the "5 Rings" game, she said that the team on the screen were "Quite possibly, the greatest team in the world", when an anagram of "Manchester City" was on.

Career
The Great Big British Quiz
The Mint - 2 April 2006 - 15 February 2007

External links
Official Beverley French website

British television presenters
Living people
1970 births
Date of birth missing (living people)
Place of birth missing (living people)